Mary Jo Taylor (born March 27, 1953) is an American politician who has served in the Kansas Senate from the 33rd district since 2017. She is a former superintendent of schools in Stafford County, Kansas.

Senator Taylor was defeated for a second term in the Aug. 4, 2020 Republican primary by Rep. Alicia Straub.

References

External links
Vote Smart Mary Jo Taylor

1953 births
Living people
Republican Party Kansas state senators
Women state legislators in Kansas
21st-century American politicians
21st-century American women politicians
Educators from Kansas
American women educators
Wichita State University alumni
Fort Hays State University alumni